Asmir Ikanović (born 30 April 1976) is a retired Bosnian-Herzegovinian association footballer. He played for the national team in the 2002 FIFA World Cup qualification.

Club career
Ikanović played for local side Čelik Zenica, but spent the majority of his career in the Austrian lower leagues. He is currently coaching in the lowest austrian league with TSV St.Georgen/Gusen

International career
He made his debut for Bosnia and Herzegovina in a March 2000 friendly match away against Jordan and has earned a total of 12 caps, scoring no goals. His final international was a September 2002 European Championship qualification match against Romania.

References

External links

1976 births
Living people
Association football central defenders
Bosnia and Herzegovina footballers
Bosnia and Herzegovina international footballers
NK Čelik Zenica players
SW Bregenz players
Premier League of Bosnia and Herzegovina players
Austrian Football Bundesliga players
Austrian Landesliga players
Bosnia and Herzegovina expatriate footballers
Expatriate footballers in Austria
Bosnia and Herzegovina expatriate sportspeople in Austria